Inder District is a district of Atyrau Region in Kazakhstan. The administrative center of the district is the urban-type settlement of Inderbor. Population:

Geography
Inder District lies in the Caspian Depression. The Ural river and its distributary Bagyrlai flow across the territory. Inder lake is located to the east of the Ural.

References

Districts of Kazakhstan
Atyrau Region